Aechmea vanhoutteana is a plant species in the genus Aechmea. This species is endemic to Brazil.

References

vanhoutteana
Flora of Brazil